David Prescott Talley (born September 11, 1950) is an American prelate of the Roman Catholic Church, serving as the bishop of the Diocese of Memphis in Tennessee since 2019.  

Talley previously served as bishop of the Diocese of Alexandria in Louisiana (2016 to 2017) and as an auxiliary bishop of the Archdiocese of Atlanta in Georgia (2013 to 2016).

Biography

Early life
David Talley was born in Columbus, Georgia, on September 11, 1950.  Raised as a  Southern Baptist, Talley converted to Catholicism in 1974 while attending Auburn University in Auburn, Alabama.  After graduating from Auburn, he entered the University of Georgia in Athens, Georgira, receiving a Master of Social Work degree. Talley then served as a caseworker for abused and neglected children in Fulton County, Georgia. After deciding to enter the priesthood, Talley began his studies at St. Meinrad School of Theology in St. Meinrad, Indiana.  He received a Master of Divinity degree from St. Meinrad in 1989.

Priesthood 
Talley was ordained into the priesthood by Archbishop Eugene Antonio Marino on June 3, 1989, for the Archdiocese of Atlanta at the Cathedral of Christ the King in Atlanta.  After his ordination, Talley served as parochial vicar at St. Jude the Apostle Parish in Atlanta until 1993. 

Talley went to Rome to study at the Pontifical Gregorian University, earning his Doctorate in Canon Law in 1998. After returning to Atlanta, he was named as an officer of the archdiocesan tribunal and as director of vocations.  Talley was named chancellor of the archdiocese in October 1999.  He also served as chaplain to the disabilities ministry.  Talley continued his studies in spiritual direction and spirituality at Spring Hill College in Mobile, Alabama.

Auxiliary Bishop of Atlanta

On January 3, 2013, Pope Benedict XVI appointed Talley as an auxiliary bishop of the Archdiocese of Atlanta and titular bishop of Lambaesis. He was consecrated on April 2, 2013 by Archbishop Wilton Gregory. Talley became the first native-born Georgian to serve as a bishop in the archdiocese.

Bishop of Alexandria
On September 21, 2016, Talley was appointed as coadjutor bishop of the Diocese of Alexandria by Pope Francis. He was installed on November 7, 2016. When Bishop Ronald Herzog retired on February 2, 2017, Talley automatically succeeded him as bishop of Alexandria.

Bishop of Memphis
On March 5, 2019,  Francis appointed Talley as bishop of the Diocese of Memphis. He was installed on April 2, 2019. On February 28, 2020, the diocese released a list of 20 priests from the diocese with credible accusations of sexual abuse of minors.  After his installation as bishop, Talley had ordered a comprehensive review of prior sexual abuse allegations, by the diocese and by an outside firm.

See also

 Catholic Church hierarchy
 Catholic Church in the United States
 Historical list of the Catholic bishops of the United States
 List of Catholic bishops of the United States
 Lists of patriarchs, archbishops, and bishops

References

External links
 Roman Catholic Diocese of Memphis Official Site
 Roman Catholic Diocese of Alexandria Official Site

Roman Catholic bishops of Alexandria
Living people
1950 births
Converts to Roman Catholicism from Baptist denominations
People from Columbus, Georgia
People from Atlanta
Roman Catholic Archdiocese of Atlanta
Roman Catholic bishops of Atlanta
21st-century Roman Catholic bishops in the United States
Knights of Peter Claver & Ladies Auxiliary